Pigmy Rock is a rock lying close off the southwest side of Alamode Island at the south extremity of the Terra Firma Islands, off the west coast of Graham Land. The Terra Firma Islands were first visited and surveyed in 1936 by the British Graham Land Expedition (BGLE) under Rymill. This rock was surveyed in 1948 by the Falkland Islands Dependencies Survey (FIDS), who so named it because of its size.

Rock formations of Graham Land
Fallières Coast